Melaleuca dealbata, commonly known as karnbor or blue paperbark, is a plant in the myrtle family, Myrtaceae and is native to tropical areas in northern Australia, New Guinea and Indonesia. It is a medium to large leafy tree, growing in wet areas such as on the edges of coastal lagoons. It has papery bark, relatively large, blue-green leaves and spikes of cream-coloured flowers over a long period.

Description
Young shoots and twigs are densely clothed in erect, white or silver hairs.

The stamens are arranged in five bundles around the flower with 5 to 8 stamens per bundle. When the fruit matures, the fine, sawdust-like seeds are released.

Taxonomy and naming
Melaleuca dealbata was first formally described in 1968 by S.T. Blake in Contributions from the Queensland Herbarium. The specific epithet (dealbata) is from the Latin dealbatus, meaning "covered with a white powder". There are a large number of common names for this plant, including karnbor, swamp tea-tree, soapy tea-tree, blue-leaved paperbark, blue paperbark, honey tree and cloudy tea-tree.

Distribution and habitat
Karnbor occurs in southern Papua New Guinea, Irian Jaya, Indonesia and northern Australia from north of Maryborough in Queensland through north Queensland to the Top End of the Northern Territory and into the Broome-Derby area and Weaber Range in the east Kimberley region of Western Australia. It grows in warm to hot, humid, frost-free zones where the mean annual rainfall is mainly  in summer. It is found in swampy areas near the coast and inland, mostly on wet sites along stream banks, on seasonally swampy ground and on the edges of lagoons with a range of soil types from sand to clay.

Ecology
The nectar-rich flowers of this tree attract parrots, honeyeaters, flying foxes and possums.

Uses
The timber from Melaleuca dealbata is moderately heavy and very strong suggesting its potential use for posts and poles. The tree is very decorative and useful for shelterbelts and soil stabilisation and has been used for the restoration of bauxite mining sites in northern Australia. It is an excellent source of nectar for honey production. The species has been tested for its oil components and found to produce an essential oil in low yield, including predominantly monoterpenes and sesquiterpenes with variation between individual plants.

References

bracteata
Myrtales of Australia
Flora of the Northern Territory
Flora of Queensland
Flora of Western Australia
Flora of New Guinea
Plants described in 1968